Maniava waterfall is one of the highest waterfalls in the Ukrainian Carpathians and is located in the Gorgany mountain ridge in Ukraine.

Geography

The water falls down the flysch formations.

Overview
The waterfall also boasts a small lake, where the water remains cool even in hot season. Fir and beech forests line the waterfall creating a very beautiful and tranquil environment. The waterfall turns a little wild following heavy rainfall or the monsoon with frequent flash floods. In winter months frozen icicles look like chimeras with an enchanting effect on the visitors who frequent the place.

See also
 Waterfalls of Ukraine

References

Waterfalls of Ukraine